A husband is a male participant in a marriage

Husband may also refer to:

Arts and entertainment
 The Husband (2006), an American novel by Dean Koontz
 Husbands (TV series) (since 2011), an American sitcom directed by Jeff Greenstein
 Husbands: The Comic, a digital comic book series published by Dark Horse Comics
 Husbands (film), a 1970 American drama directed by John Cassavetes
 The Husband (film), a 2013 Canadian comedy

People
 Husband (surname), a list of people
 Husbands (surname), a list of people
 Husband E. Kimmel (1882–1968), admiral who was the US Navy commander during the attack on Pearl Harbor

Places
 Husband, Pennsylvania, a community in the United States
 Husbands, Barbados, a populated place
 Husband Hill, on Mars
 Husband, a lunar crater inside Apollo (crater)

See also

 Common-law husband
 Househusband
 Husband pillow—type of cushion
 Work husband
 Ex-husband